Russell Edgar Smith (born January 28, 1987) is a former American Football quarterback. He was drafted by the Tennessee Titans in the sixth round of the 2010 NFL Draft. He played college football at Florida Atlantic.

Smith played for the Titans for four seasons as a backup, and only started one game. He then had a brief offseason stint with the New York Giants in 2014. After his playing career ended, he began a career as a high school football coach.

College career
As a sophomore at Florida Atlantic, Smith passed for 32 touchdowns and nine interceptions. In his four-year career, he started in 45 games for the Owls. He graduated with a Bachelor of Science in Management of Information Systems.

College statistics

Professional career

Tennessee Titans
Smith was selected by the Tennessee Titans in the sixth round (176th overall) of the 2010 NFL Draft. He was the first ever player from FAU to be drafted.
He was signed to a four-year contract on June 17, 2010.

Smith made his NFL debut on November 21, 2010 against the Washington Redskins after starter Vince Young left the game with an injured throwing hand, completing 3-of-9 passes for 62 yards and one interception. Titans head coach Jeff Fisher later declared that Smith would become the team's starting quarterback due to Young's season-ending thumb surgery and Kerry Collins' calf injury.
His first start was in a 20-0 shutout loss to the Houston Texans.  Smith had 17 completions in 31 passes for 138 yards and was intercepted three times, all by CB Glover Quin.

Smith did not have one snap during the 2011 regular season.

In 2012, he stepped in for Matt Hasselbeck and went 3-of-5 for 34 yards. He was waived/injured by the Titans on August 31, 2013. He was re-signed the next day, and put on the team's practice squad.

New York Giants
On Monday April 28, 2014 the New York Giants signed Smith. Smith was released on May 12, 2014.

NFL career statistics

Coaching career
In March 2015, Smith was announced as the new head football coach at the Grace Christian Academy in Franklin, Tennessee, having previously worked two years as the program's quarterbacks coach and offensive coordinator. He parted ways with GCA in February 2022 after eight seasons, having compiled a 21-49 record over seven seasons as head coach and leading the GCA Lions to all three of the team's playoff appearances in 2017 (1A), 2020 and 2021 (both DII-A).

Personal life
Smith's wife, Nicole, is the head volleyball coach and strength and conditioning coach at Grace Christian Academy. They have three sons, Rustyn, Camdyn and Koltyn.

References

External links
 Grace Christian Academy profile

1987 births
Living people
American football quarterbacks
Canadian football quarterbacks
American players of Canadian football
Calgary Stampeders players
Florida Atlantic Owls football players
New York Giants players
Tennessee Titans players
High school football coaches in Tennessee
Sandalwood High School alumni
Players of American football from Jacksonville, Florida